Maestlin is a small, bowl-shaped impact crater located near the eastern edge of the lunar Oceanus Procellarum. It was named after German mathematician Michael Maestlin. To the east lies the crater Encke and to the northeast is Kepler. Just to the southeast of Maestlin is the curved, ridge-like remains of Maestlin R, a walled plain that has been almost completed submerged by the mare. South of this feature is a system of linear rilles named Rimae Maestlin. The mare surface around Maestlin is dusted with ray material from Kepler.

Satellite craters
By convention these features are identified on Lunar maps by placing the letter on the side of the crater midpoint that is closest to Maestlin.

References

 
 
 
 
 
 
 
 
 
 
 

Impact craters on the Moon